Nutbush may refer to:

Nutbush, Tennessee, a town in Haywood County, childhood home of singer Tina Turner
Nutbush Township, Warren County, North Carolina, one of twelve townships in Warren County, North Carolina
Nutbush, Memphis, a district of Memphis, Tennessee
"Nutbush City Limits", a song about Nutbush, Tennessee by singer Tina Turner
The Nutbush, a dance categorized as a Line dance, performed to the song Nutbush City Limits